Verkhneyuldashevo (Ürge Yuldaş) is a rural locality (a village) in Zirgansky Selsoviet, Meleuzovsky District, Bashkortostan, Russia. The population was 392 as of 2010. There are 10 streets.

Geography 
Verkhneyuldashevo is located 45 km north of Meleuz (the district's administrative centre) by road. Salavat is the nearest rural locality.

References 

Rural localities in Meleuzovsky District